The men's 50 metre backstroke event at the 11th FINA World Swimming Championships (25m) took place 14 – 15 December 2012 at the Sinan Erdem Dome.

Records
Prior to this competition, the existing world and championship records were as follows.

No new records were set during this competition.

Results

Heats

Semifinals

Final

The final was held at 19:07.

References

External links
 2012 FINA World Swimming Championships (25 m): Men's 50 metre backstroke entry list, from OmegaTiming.com.

Backstroke 050 metre, men's
World Short Course Swimming Championships